Judith Richmond Walters is an American neuropharmacologist serving as chief of the neurophysiological pharmacology section at the National Institute of Neurological Disorders and Stroke.

Life 
Walters received her B.A. degree from Mount Holyoke College and her Ph.D. from Yale University. Her 1972 dissertation was titled Dopaminergic Neurons: Effect of Gamma-Hydroxybutyrate. She studied the pharmacology and neurophysiology of the dopamine system in the basal ganglia. Her doctoral advisor was Robert Henry Roth. Walters did postdoctoral work at the department of psychiatry at the Yale University School of Medicine and then moved to the Experimental Therapeutics Branch in the National Institute of Neurological Disorders and Stroke (NINDS).

Walters is a neuropharmacologist working as chief of the Neurophysiological Pharmacology Section at the NINDS. Her laboratory explores the role of dopamine in basal ganglia-thalamocortical function. She studies the mechanisms in the brain that mediate dysfunctions associated with neurological diseases and disorders such as Parkinson’s disease. She became a Fellow of the American Association for the Advancement of Science in 2018.

References 

Living people
Year of birth missing (living people)
Place of birth missing (living people)
Mount Holyoke College alumni
Yale University alumni
National Institutes of Health people
Fellows of the American Association for the Advancement of Science
Neuropharmacologists
American pharmacologists
Women pharmacologists
American women neuroscientists
20th-century American women scientists
21st-century American women scientists